Wilson Edelber Graniolatti Cha (born July 13, 1962 in Nueva Palmira, Uruguay), known as Wilson Graniolatti, is a former Uruguayan footballer that played for clubs of Uruguay, Chile and Mexico.

Teams (Player)
  Nacional 1985-1986
  Toluca 1986-1988
  Santos Laguna 1988-1989
  Toluca 1989-1990
  Queretaro 1990-1991
  Atlante 1991-1996
  Deportes Concepción 1996

Teams (Manager)
  Atlas (Assistant) 1997-2001
  Toluca (Assistant) 2001-2002
  Toluca 2002
  Club San Luis 2003-2004
  Veracruz 2004-2005
  Santos Laguna 2006
  Tijuana 2008-2009
  Chiapas (Assistant) 2011
  Toluca 2012
  Atlante 2013

Notes

External links
 

1962 births
Living people
People from Colonia Department
Uruguayan footballers
Uruguayan football managers
Uruguayan expatriate footballers
Club Nacional de Football players
Deportivo Toluca F.C. players
Atlante F.C. footballers
Querétaro F.C. footballers
Santos Laguna footballers
Deportes Concepción (Chile) footballers
Chilean Primera División players
Liga MX players
Expatriate footballers in Chile
Expatriate footballers in Mexico
Expatriate football managers in Mexico
Deportivo Toluca F.C. managers
San Luis F.C. managers
C.D. Veracruz managers
Santos Laguna managers
Club Tijuana managers
Atlante F.C. managers
Association football defenders